Paola Suárez (born 23 June 1976) is a retired tennis player from Argentina. She was one of the most prominent women's doubles players throughout the early and mid-2000s, winning eight Grand Slam titles, all of them with Virginia Ruano Pascual, and holding the No. 1 doubles ranking for 87 non-consecutive weeks. She was also a singles top ten player and semifinalist at the 2004 French Open.

Career
Suárez began playing professional tennis at the age of 15. In 1994, she joined the professional tour as a singles player.

Suárez won four WTA titles (2004 Canberra, 2003 Vienna, 1998 & 2001 Bogotá) and 12 other minor tournaments. In 2004, she reached her only Grand Slam singles semi-final by defeating the 18th seed and future Wimbledon champion Maria Sharapova, but lost to Elena Dementieva. That year, she reached her highest WTA ranking of No. 9, to become the highest-ranked Argentine women's player since Gabriela Sabatini achieved the No. 3 ranking in 1989. Also in 2004, she won the bronze medal at the Olympic Games in Athens for the women's doubles with Patricia Tarabini.

She had success in singles but her best results came in doubles, winning more than half a dozen titles partnering fellow Argentine Laura Montalvo. However Suárez's more long-standing doubles partnership was with the Spaniard Virginia Ruano Pascual, with whom she won 32 of her 39 titles. Besides numerous WTA Tour titles, they won the French Open on four occasions, the US Open three times, and the Australian Open in 2004. Suárez and Ruano Pascual were the No. 1 female pair for three consecutive years after 9 September 2002 and were the WTA Tour Doubles Team of the Year in 2002, 2003 and 2004. They also reached nine straight Grand Slam finals, two short of Navratilova and Shriver's record of eleven.

In 2005, Suárez announced her forthcoming retirement for personal reasons. In June of that year, she underwent a labrum hip clinical intervention, with a recovery time of three to four months. She restarted playing in Sydney in January 2006 with Ruano Pascual, reaching the final, but suffered a calf injury short after. Later that year, she also reached the final of Wimbledon with Ruano Pascual, marking her third appearance in a final there.

Suárez returned to the circuit with a victory over Dinara Safina, ranked No. 15, in the San Diego Open singles tournament.

On 1 September 2007, Suárez retired after losing in the mixed doubles second round at the US Open. She partnered Kevin Ullyett and lost to Jamie Murray and Liezel Huber, 5–7, 4–6. She briefly returned to the WTA doubles tour in 2012, partnering her fellow Argentinian Gisela Dulko. The pair played at the London Summer Olympics but lost in the first round.

In her career, Suárez earned more than $5.2 million, with four singles titles on the WTA Tour, and eight doubles Grand Slam titles.

Significant finals

Grand Slam tournaments

Doubles: 14 (8 titles, 6 runner-ups)

Mixed doubles: 2 (2 runner-ups)

Olympic games

Doubles: 1 (bronze medal)

WTA career finals

Singles: 8 (4 titles, 4 runner-ups)

Doubles: 69 (44 titles, 25 runner-ups)

ITF Circuit finals

Singles (12–4)

Doubles (7–6)

Performance timelines

Singles

Doubles

Record against top-10 players
Suárez's match record against players who have been ranked in the top 10, with those who have been ranked No. 1 in boldface
 
  Patty Schnyder 5–4
  Mary Pierce 4–2
  Barbara Schett 3–2
  Jelena Dokic 2–0
  Anna Kournikova 2–0
  Svetlana Kuznetsova 2–0
  Alicia Molik 2–0
  Dinara Safina 2–0
  Daniela Hantuchová 2–1
  Francesca Schiavone 2–1
  Nadia Petrova 2–2
  Sandrine Testud 2–2
  Magdalena Maleeva 2–3
  Amélie Mauresmo 2–3
  Ai Sugiyama 2–3
  Vera Zvonareva 2–3
  Anke Huber 1–0
  Maria Kirilenko 1–0
  Barbara Paulus 1–0
  Lucie Šafářová 1–0
  Maria Sharapova 1–0
  Nathalie Tauziat 1–0
  Andrea Temesvári 1–0
  Serena Williams 1–0
  Jelena Janković 1–1
  Iva Majoli 1–1
  Anastasia Myskina 1–1
  Mary Joe Fernandez 1–2
  Chanda Rubin 1–2
  Elena Dementieva 1–3
  Amanda Coetzer 1–5
  Victoria Azarenka 0–1
  Anna Chakvetadze 0–1
  Zina Garrison 0–1
  Julie Halard-Decugis 0–1
  Justine Henin 0–1
  Brenda Schultz-McCarthy 0–1
  Irina Spîrlea 0–1
  Helena Suková 0–1
  Marion Bartoli 0–2
  Conchita Martínez 0–2
  Monica Seles 0–2
  Venus Williams 0–2
  Natasha Zvereva 0–2
  Jennifer Capriati 0–3
  Kim Clijsters 0–3
  Steffi Graf 0–3
  Dominique Monami 0–4
  Arantxa Sánchez Vicario 0–4
  Lindsay Davenport 0–7

References

External links

 
 
 
 Ole 2005, on her retirement
 Paola and Virginia
 Paola Suarez at the TheTennisTimes

1976 births
Living people
Argentine female tennis players
Australian Open (tennis) champions
French Open champions
Olympic bronze medalists for Argentina
Olympic medalists in tennis
Olympic tennis players of Argentina
People from Pergamino
Tennis players at the 2000 Summer Olympics
Tennis players at the 2004 Summer Olympics
Tennis players at the 2012 Summer Olympics
US Open (tennis) champions
Hopman Cup competitors
Grand Slam (tennis) champions in women's doubles
Medalists at the 2004 Summer Olympics
WTA number 1 ranked doubles tennis players
ITF World Champions
Sportspeople from Buenos Aires Province